Edward Echols (September 2, 1849 – December 19, 1914) was a U.S. political figure from the Commonwealth of Virginia.  Echols held office as the 18th Lieutenant Governor of Virginia from 1898 to 1902.

Edward Echols was born in Monroe County (now in West Virginia). There is some confusion over his birth year, but he is listed in the 1850 census as being one year old in September 1850. He and his family moved to Staunton, Virginia, after the Civil War.  He also served for six years in the Virginia House of Delegates and for a total of twelve years in the Senate of Virginia.  His father, John Echols, was a brigadier general in the Confederate Army during the American Civil War. Echols served as the National Valley Bank's third president from 1905 to 1915.

His house at Staunton, known as Oakdene, was added to the National Register of Historic Places in 1982.

Sources

External links
Biography at Encyclopedia Virginia

1849 births
1914 deaths
Democratic Party members of the Virginia House of Delegates
Democratic Party Virginia state senators
Lieutenant Governors of Virginia
Washington and Lee University alumni
People from Union, West Virginia
Politicians from Staunton, Virginia
19th-century American politicians
20th-century American politicians